The Republic F-84F Thunderstreak was an American swept-wing turbojet fighter-bomber. While an evolutionary development of the straight-wing F-84 Thunderjet, the F-84F was a new design. The RF-84F Thunderflash was a photo reconnaissance version.

Development
In 1948, a swept wing version of the F-84 was created with the hope of bringing performance to the level of the F-86. The last production F-84E was fitted with a swept tail, a new wing with 38.5 degrees of leading edge sweep and 3.5 degrees of anhedral, and a J35-A-25 engine producing 5,300 pound-force (23.58 kN) of thrust. The aircraft was designated XF-96A. It flew on 3 June 1950 with Oscar P. Haas at the controls. Although the airplane was capable of 602 knots (693 mph, 1,115 km/h), the performance gain over the F-84E was considered minor. Nonetheless, it was ordered into production in July 1950 as the F-84F Thunderstreak. The F-84 designation was retained because the fighter was expected to be a low-cost improvement of the straight-wing Thunderjet with over 55 percent commonality in tooling.

In the meantime, the USAF, hoping for improved high-altitude performance from a more powerful engine, arranged for the British Armstrong Siddeley Sapphire turbojet engine to be built in the United States as the Wright J65. To accommodate the larger engine, YF-84Fs with a British-built Sapphire as well as production F-84Fs with the J65 had a vertically stretched fuselage, with the air intake attaining an oval cross-section. Production delays with the F-84F forced the USAF to order a number of straight-wing F-84Gs as an interim measure.

Production quickly ran into problems. Although tooling commonality with the Thunderjet was supposed to be 55 percent, in reality only fifteen percent of tools could be reused. To make matters worse, the F-84F utilized press-forged wing spars and ribs. At the time, only three presses in the United States could manufacture these, and priority was given to the Boeing B-47 Stratojet bomber over the F-84. The YJ65-W-1 engine was considered obsolete and the improved J65-W-3 did not become available until 1954. When the first production F-84F finally flew on 22 November 1952, it differed from the service test aircraft. It had a different canopy which opened up and back instead of sliding to the rear (a unique design, the canopy was mounted on a pair of hydraulic rams and a pivoted lever arm that allowed it to lift up and backwards while remaining almost level with the fuselage, instead of the more common simple hinged canopy), as well as airbrakes on the sides of the fuselage instead of the bottom of the aircraft. The aircraft was considered not ready for operational deployment due to control and stability problems. The first 275 aircraft, equipped with conventional stabilizer-elevator tailplanes, suffered from accelerated stall pitch-up and poor turning ability at combat speeds. Beginning with Block 25, the problem was improved upon by the introduction of a hydraulically powered one-piece stabilator. A number of aircraft were also retrofitted with spoilers for improved high-speed control. As a result, the F-84F was not declared operational until 12 May 1954.

Thunderflash

The second YF-84F prototype was completed with wing-root air intakes. These were not adopted for the fighter due to loss of thrust. However, this arrangement permitted placement of cameras in the nose and the design was adopted for the RF-84F Thunderflash reconnaissance version. The first YRF-84F was completed in February 1952. The aircraft retained an armament of four machine guns and could carry up to fifteen cameras. Innovations included computerized controls which adjusted camera settings for light, speed, and altitude, a periscope to give the pilot better visualization of the target, and a voice recorder to let the pilot narrate his observations. Being largely identical to the F-84F, the Thunderflash suffered from the same production delays and engine problems, delaying operational service until March 1954. The aircraft was retired from active duty in 1957, only to be reactivated in 1961, and finally retired from the ANG in 1972.

Several modified Thunderflashes were used in the FICON project.

Design
The Thunderstreak suffered from the same poor takeoff performance as the straight-wing Thunderjet despite having a more powerful engine. In reality, almost 700 pounds-force (3.11 kN) or ten percent of total thrust was lost because the J65 was installed at an angle and its jet pipe was not perfectly straight (in addition to the usual thrust losses from the long jet pipe). On a hot day, 7,500 feet (2,285 m) of runway were required for takeoff roll. A typical takeoff speed was 160 knots (185 mph, 300 km/h). Like the Thunderjet, the Thunderstreak excelled at cruise and had predictable handling characteristics within its performance envelope. Like its predecessor, it also suffered from accelerated stall pitch-up and potential resulting separation of wings from the airplane. In addition, spins in the F-84F were practically unrecoverable and ejection was the only recourse below 10,000 feet (3,000 m).

Operational history

Project Run In completed operational tests in November 1954 and found the aircraft to be to USAF satisfaction and considerably better than the F-84G. However, ongoing engine failures resulted in the entire fleet being grounded in early 1955. Also, the J65 engine continued to suffer from flameouts when flying through heavy rain or snow. As the result of the problems, the active duty phaseout began almost as soon as the F-84F entered service in 1954, and was completed by 1958. Increased tensions in Germany associated with construction of the Berlin Wall in 1961 resulted in reactivation of the F-84F fleet. In 1962, the fleet was grounded due to the corrosion of control rods. A total of 1,800 man hours were expended to bring each aircraft to full operational capacity. Stress corrosion eventually forced the retirement of ANG F-84Fs in 1971.

On 9 March 1955, Lt. Col. Robert R. Scott, in a F-84F Thunderstreak, set a three-hour, 44-minute and 53-second record for the  flight from Los Angeles to New York.

With the appearance of the Republic F-105 Thunderchief, which used wing-root mounted air intakes of a similar design to those fitted on the RF-84F, the photorecon variant Thunderflash became known as the Thud's Mother. The earlier F-84A had been nicknamed the "Hog" and the F-84F "Super Hog," the F-105 becoming the "Ultra Hog".

In what is probably one of the very few air-to-air engagements involving the F-84F, two Turkish Air Force F-84F Thunderstreaks shot down two Iraqi Il-28 Beagle bombers that crossed the Turkish border by mistake during a bombing operation against Iraqi Kurdish insurgents. This engagement took place on 16 August 1962.

The F-84F was retired from active service with the USAF in 1964, and replaced by the North American F-100 Super Sabre. The RF-84F was replaced by the RF-101 Voodoo in USAF units, and relegated to duty in the Air National Guard. The last F-84F Thunderflash retired from the ANG in 1971. Three Hellenic Air Force RF-84Fs that were retired in 1991 were the last operational F-84s.

Variants

YF-84F Two swept-wing prototypes of the F-84F, initially designated YF-96.
F-84F Thunderstreak Swept wing version with Wright J65 engine. Tactical Air Command aircraft were equipped with Low-Altitude Bombing System (LABS) for delivering nuclear bombs. 2,711 built, 1,301 went to NATO under Mutual Defense Assistance Program (MDAP).
GRF-84F25 RF-84Fs were converted to be carried, and launched from the bomb bay of a GRB-36F bomber as part of the FICON project. The aircraft were later redesignated RF-84K.
RF-84F ThunderflashReconnaissance version of the F-84F with intakes relocated to the wing-roots, 715 built.
RF-84K Thunderflash (FICON) RF-84F with a retractable probe for hookup with carrier GRB-36Ds and tailplanes with marked anhedral, 25 redesignated from RF-84F.
XF-84H Two F-84Fs were converted into experimental aircraft. Each was fitted with an Allison XT40-A-1 turboprop engine of 5,850 shaft horsepower (4,365 kW) driving a supersonic propeller. Ground crews dubbed the XF-84H the Thunderscreech due to its extreme noise output.
YF-84J Two F-84Fs were converted into YF-84J prototypes with enlarged nose intakes and a deepened fuselages for the General Electric J73 engine; the YF-84J reached Mach 1.09 in level flight on 7 April 1954. The project was cancelled due to the excessive cost of converting existent F-84Fs.

Operators

 Belgian Air Force - 197 x F-84F, 34 x RF-84F operated from 1955.

 Royal Danish Air Force - 23× RF-84F received, in service from 1957 to 1971.

 French Air Force - 328 F-84Fs and 88 RF-84Fs received from 1955.

 West German Air Force - 450 F-84Fs and 108 RF-84Fs received. In service from 1956 to 1966.

 Greek Air Force

 Israeli Air Force - 18 French F-84Fs along with their pilots were temporarily transferred to the IAF during the Suez Crisis.

 Italian Air Force - operated 194 Republic F-84F Thunderstreak and 78 RF-84F Thunderflash from 1956 until 1974

 Royal Netherlands Air Force (180× F-84F, 24× RF-84F 1955–1970)

 Royal Norwegian Air Force (35× RF-84F 1956–1970)

 Republic of China Air Force - About 25 RF-84Fs operated from 1954.

 Turkish Air Force

 United States Air Force (1496× F-84F, 388× RF-84F 1952–1972)

Aircraft on display

Belgium
F-84F FU-30, Royal Museum of the Armed Forces and Military History in Brussels
Unknown – Balen-Keiheuvel Aerodrome
Unknown – Beverlo Air Base

RF-84F Thunderflash
51-1922 - FR-27 Gate Guardian at the Aerodrome Spa-La Sauveniere Airport 
51-1945 – FR28, Royal Museum of the Armed Forces and Military History, Brussels

Denmark

RF-84F
C-581 – Flyvestation Karup Historiske Forening Museet, Karup
C-264 – Danish Collection of Vintage Aircraft, Skjern

France
F-84F
Unknown – Musée de l’air et de l’espace
Tactical number 4-SA - Saint-Léger-sous-Beuvray in Montandé hamlet.

Germany 
F-84F Thunderstreak
 tactical number BF-106 – Luftwaffenmuseum Gatow - Militärhistorisches Museum Flugplatz Berlin-Gatow
 tactical number DD-313 – Luftwaffenmuseum Gatow - Militärhistorisches Museum Flugplatz Berlin-Gatow
 tactical number DE 254 (s.n.51-1702) – Flugausstellung Peter Junior, Hermeskeil
 tactical number BF 105 (s.n.52-6778) – Flugausstellung Peter Junior, Hermeskeil

RF-84F Thunderflash
 tactical number EB-344 – Luftwaffenmuseum Gatow - Militärhistorisches Museum der Bundeswehr
 tactical number EA 241 (s.n.52-7663) – Flugausstellung Peter Junior, Hermeskeil

Greece 
F-84F Thunderstreak
 tactical number 26-595 - Hellenic Air Force Museum (Μουσείο Πολεμικής Αεροπορίας) 
 tactical number 37050 - Larissa air base 

RF-84F Thunderflash
 tactical number 17-011 (s/n 51-17011 - ex-Luftwaffe) - Hellenic Air Force Museum (Μουσείο Πολεμικής Αεροπορίας) 

F-84F Thunderstreak
 tactical number unknown - Rentina Agrafon (Ρεντίνα Αγράφων)

Italy 
F-84F
53-6892 – Italian Air Force Museum, Vigna di Valle near Rome.
D1003 - Museo Nazionale Scienza e Tecnologia Leonardo da Vinci, Milano

RF-84F Thunderflash
52-7458 – Italian Air Force Museum, Vigna di Valle.
52-7456 - private display of P.i.p. Lido, Via Roma Destra, 30016 Venice, Italy (coordinates 45.505538, 12.627090)

Netherlands
F-84F
52-7174 - P-119, On display in front of the JTAC school in Schaarsbergen.
52-7185 - P-134, in storage at ROCvA Airport College, Hoofddorp.
53-6582 - P-229, Stored at Reek. Painted as P-312
53-6584 - P-248, Gate Guard at Volkel Air Base
53-6600 - P-254, in storage at Nationaal Militair Museum, Soesterberg.
53-6604 - P-224, Stored at Reek
53-6612 - P-226, on display at Nationaal Militair Museum, Soesterberg.
53-6726 - P-230, Nose section only. Stored at Nationaal Militair Museum, Soesterberg.
53-6742 - P-231, Gate Guard at Eindhoven Air Base
53-6916 - P-191, Gate Guard at Gilze-Rijen Air Base
RF-84F
51-11253 - TP-19, in storage at Nationaal Militair Museum, Soesterberg.
53-7644 - FR31, ex. Belgian Air Force. Now displayed as P-7 at Schaarsbergen.

Norway
RF-84F Thunderflash
51-17055 – T3-H, Restored to original bare aluminium scheme, Air Force Training Center, Kjevik.
51-17045 – T3-N, AZ-N, Flyhistorisk Museum, Sola, Stavanger Airport, Sola, near Stavanger.
51-17047 – AZ-A, Norwegian Aviation Museum, Bodø (Nose section only)
51-17053 – AZ-G, Forsvarets flysamling Gardermoen, Oslo Airport, Gardermoen near Oslo.
52-8723 – AZ-X, Sandefjord Airport, Torp, near Sandefjord.

Poland
F-84F
52-7157 (Ex-Belgium) – Polish Aviation Museum, Kraków.

Russia
F-84F
?-3033 (Ex-Belgium) – Technical Museum, Moscow.

Turkey
F-84F
52-8733 – Istanbul Aviation Museum.
52-8941 – Atatürk Airport, İstanbul.
RF-84F
51-1860 - Bursa Uludag University.
51-1901 – Istanbul Aviation Museum.
51-1917 – Istanbul Aviation Museum.
51-1924 – (ex-Dutch AF as P-24) TUAF Museum, Etimsegut AB, Turkey

United Kingdom
F-84F
52-6541 – North East Aircraft Museum, Sunderland.
52-7133 - Bentwaters Cold War Museum.

United States
XF-84F
49-2430 – National Museum of the United States Air Force, Dayton, Ohio.

F-84F

Unknown – On roadside display (private owner) in Blacksville, West Virginia.
51-1386 – Barksdale Global Power Museum, Barksdale AFB, Louisiana.
51-1620 – Empire State Aerosciences Museum in Glenville, New York.
51-1639 – Springfield Downtown Airport, Springfield, Missouri.
51-1640 – Hill Aerospace Museum, Hill AFB, Utah.
51-1659 - Combat Air Museum, Topeka Regional Airport at Forbes Field, Topeka, Kansas.  
51-1713 – Delta County Airport in Escanaba, Michigan.
51-1714 – Strategic Air Command & Aerospace Museum in Ashland, Nebraska.
51-1739 – Korean War memorial South Whitley, Indiana.
51-1772 – Aerospace Museum of California in McClellan, California.
51-1786 – Virginia Air & Space Center in Hampton, Virginia.
51-1797 – Ohio ANG Base in Springfield, Ohio.
51-1817 – Camp Robinson in Little Rock, Arkansas.
51-1818 – Fairfield MAP in Iowa.
51-1822 – Illinois ANG Base in Springfield, Illinois.
51-9350 – Air Force Flight Test Center Museum at Edwards AFB, California.
51-9396 – Holloman AFB, New Mexico.
51-9430 – Joint Base McGuire-Dix-Lakehurst, New Jersey.  False markings of 52-7066 applied.
51-9432 – March Field Air Museum in Riverside, California.
51-9433 – Castle Air Museum in Atwater, California.
51-9444 – Seminole Valley Park in Cedar Rapids, Iowa.
51-9451 – Wilson Park in Granite City, IL.
51-9480 – American Airpower Museum, East Farmingdale, New York.
51-9495 – Air Force Armament Museum, Eglin AFB, Florida.
51-9501 – Yankee Air Museum, Belleville, Michigan.
51-9514 – Allen County War Memorial Coliseum in Ft. Wayne, Indiana.
51-9522 – Evergreen Aviation & Space Museum in McMinnville, Oregon.
51-9531 – Palm Springs Air Museum, Palm Springs, California.  Formerly at Octave Chanute Aerospace Museum in Rantoul, Illinois.
52-6379 - Wauchula Veteran's Park in Wauchula, Florida
52-6385 - VFW Post 2503, Omaha, Nebraska.
52-6438 – Georgia Veterans State Park in Cordele, Georgia.
52-6455 – American Legion post #490, Houston, Texas.
52-6456 – Veterans of Foreign Wars post #6791, West Chicago, Illinois.
52-6461 – Lackland AFB, Texas.
52-6470 – Mountain Home AFB, Idaho.
52-6497 – Iowa Gold Star Museum in Johnston, Iowa.
52-6526 – National Museum of the United States Air Force in Dayton, Ohio.
52-6553 – Window on the Plains Museum in Dumas, Texas.
52-6555 – Wings of Freedom Aviation Museum in Horsham, Pennsylvania.
52-6563 – Pima Air & Space Museum in Tucson, Arizona.
52-6634 – Defense Supply Center Richmond in Richmond, Virginia.
52-6701 – Museum of Aviation, Robins AFB, Georgia.
52-6782 – Luke AFB, Arizona.
52-6993 – Wilbur Wright Birthplace and Museum near Millville, Indiana.
52-7019 – Cheyenne Municipal Airport in Wyoming.
52-7080 – England AFB, Louisiana.
52-8837 – Richmond Airport, Virginia.
52-8886 – South Dakota Air and Space Museum at Ellsworth AFB, South Dakota.

RF-84F Thunderflash
51-1929 - Neligh, Nebraska
51-1944 – Pima Air & Space Museum in Tucson, Arizona.
51-1948 – Harlan Airport (HNR) in Harlan, Iowa.
51-11259 – Lincoln Air National Guard Base, Nebraska.
51-17046 – Hill Aerospace Museum, Hill AFB, Utah, (Nose section only)
52-7249 – Dannelly Field ANG Collection, Montgomery, Alabama.
52-7259 – National Museum of the United States Air Force in Dayton, Ohio.
52-7265 – Planes of Fame Museum in Chino, California.
52-7409 – Birmingham ANGB, Birmingham, Alabama.
52-7421 – Yankee Air Museum, Belleville, Michigan.
53-7529 - Berry Field ANGB, Nashville, Tennessee. <ref>"RF-84 Thunderflash/53-7529"</ref>
53-7570 – Enka Middle School, Candler, North Carolina.
53-7595 – American Airpower Museum, East Farmingdale, New York.

Accidents and incidents
On 7 July 1954, one F-84F of a flight of four en route to Bergstrom Air Force Base in Austin, TX, crashed into the Kansas City, Kansas business district shortly after departing Fairfax Municipal Airport, Kansas City, KS.  2nd Lt. John H. Kapeles, pilot, assigned to the 27th Fighter Escort Wing, died in the crash.  Three civilians died on the ground when the plane crashed onto their homes. The plane had just come off the General Motors Fairfax Assembly Plant production line and had been test flown.  Eyewitnesses reported that the plane plunged at a high speed toward the ground after the flight had banked toward the west from the east.  The three remaining planes returned to Fairfax Municipal Airport.
 On 9 December 1955, a USAF F-84F on an instrument training flight from RAF Sculthorpe in Norfolk experienced a flameout and the pilot ejected. The aircraft crashed into Lodge Moor Hospital, Sheffield. The crash killed one patient and injured seven others.
 On 4 April 1957, the USAF Captain Richard W. Higgins died after a low ejection with one of the first F-84Fs of the German Air Force near the Fürstenfeldbruck Air Base.
 On 14 September 1961, two West German F-84Fs of the West German Air Force crossed into East German airspace due to a navigational error, eventually landing at Berlin Tegel Airport, evading a large number of Soviet fighter aircraft. The event came at a historically difficult time during the Cold War, one month after the construction of the Berlin Wall.
The book Stranger to the Ground by Richard Bach was dedicated to him.

Specifications (F-84F)

Communications Equipment
AN/ARC-33 or 34 command set radio
AN/APX-6 or 6A IFF set
AN/AR-6 radio compass
AN/APW-11 or 11A radar set
AN/APN-21 TACAN set

Notable appearances in media
Richard Bach, who later wrote the bestseller Jonathan Livingston Seagull, was an ANG F-84F pilot who was once activated for duty in Europe. His first book, Stranger to the Ground, described in detail what it was like to fly the Thunderstreak in the course of an operational flight at night from England to France in adverse weather.

F-84Fs were also used to represent North Korean MiG-15 fighters in the 1958 film version of James Salters' novel "The Hunters", because none of the Soviet fighters were available during the ongoing Cold War for filming. They were painted a flat gray with red star insignia.

See also

References

Notes

Bibliography
 Bowers, Peter M. and Enzo Angellucci. The American Fighter. New York: Orion Books, 1987. .
 Donald, David and Lake, Jon, eds. Encyclopedia of World Military Aircraft. London: AIRtime Publishing, 1996. .
 Dorr, Robert F. and David Donald. Fighters of the United States Air Force. London: Temple Press Aerospace, 1990. .
 Forrer, Frits T. The Fun of Flying. Gulf Breeze, Florida: Holland's Glory, 1992. .

 Hiltermann, Gijs. "Republic F-84F Thunderstreak." Vliegend in Nederland 1 (in Dutch). Eindhoven, Netherlands: Flash Aviation, 1988. .
 Keaveney, Kevin. Republic F-84/Swept-Wing Variants (Aerofax Minigraph, No 15). London: Aerofax, 1987. .
 
 Knaack, Marcelle Size. Encyclopedia of US Air Force Aircraft and Missile Systems: Volume 1 Post-World War II Fighters 1945–1973. Washington, DC: Office of Air Force History, 1978. .
 Miller, Jay. "Tip Tow & Tom-Tom". Air Enthusiast, No. 9, February–May 1979, pp. 40–42. .
 Stafrace, Charles. Republic F-84F Thunderstreak and RF-84F Thunderflash. Warpaint Series No. 100. Denbigh East, UK: Warpaint Books Ltd., 2014. .  
 Swanborough, Gordon and Peter M. Bowers. United States Military Aircraft Since 1909. Washington, DC: Smithsonian, 1989. .
 United States Air Force Museum Guidebook. Wright-Patterson AFB, Dayton, Ohio: Air Force Museum Foundation, 1975.
 Wagner, Ray. American Combat Planes, Third Enlarged Edition. New York: Doubleday, 1982. .
 Wilson, Stewart. Combat Aircraft since 1945. Fyshwick, Australia: Aerospace Publications, 2000. .
 Pretat, Samuel. "Republic F-84F Thunderstreak & RF-84F Thunderflash." "Republic F-84F Thunderstreak & RF-84F Thunderflash." Editions Minimonde76, 2006.

External links

 F-84F Thunderstreak

 F-84F at Mercer Air Field, Georgia

F-084F
Republic F-84F
Single-engined jet aircraft
Cruciform tail aircraft
Mid-wing aircraft
Aircraft first flown in 1950